Preto River or Prêto River may refer to these rivers in Brazil:

Amapá
 Preto River (Amapá)

Amazonas
 Preto da Eva River
 Preto River (Padauari River tributary)
 Preto River (Unini River tributary)

Bahia
 Preto River (Bahia, Atlantic Ocean)
 Preto River (Bahia, Grande River tributary)
 Preto River (Bahia, Jequié River tributary)

Espírito Santo
 Preto River (Cricaré River tributary)
 Preto River (Espírito Santo), Itabapoana River tributary
 Preto River (Itabapoana River tributary), west of the above
 Preto River (Itaúnas River tributary)
 Preto River (Mariricu River tributary)

Goiás
 Preto River (Paracatu River tributary)
 Preto River (Paranaíba River tributary)
 Preto River (Tocantins River tributary)

Maranhão
 Preto River (Maranhão)

Minas Gerais
 Preto River (Araçuaí River tributary)
 Preto River (Paraibuna River tributary)

Paraíba
 Preto River (Paraíba)

Paraná
 Preto River (Paraná)

Pernambuco
 Preto River (Pernambuco)

Rio de Janeiro
 Preto River (Piabanha River tributary)
 Preto River (Ururaí River tributary)

Rondônia
 Preto de Candeias River
 Preto do Crespo River
 Preto River (Rondônia)

Roraima
 Preto River (Roraima)

Santa Catarina
 Preto River (Negro River tributary)
 Preto River (Do Peixe River tributary)

São Paulo
 Preto River (São Paulo)

See also
 Preto (disambiguation)
 Rio Preto (disambiguation)
 Río Prieto (disambiguation)